Graham Fitzpatrick is a Scottish Film director and Screenwriter.

Biography
Graham Fitzpatrick was raised in the Edinburgh's Royston housing scheme, attending Ainslie Park High School and Broughton High School His YTS traineeship at film workshop Pilton Video offered a basic grounding in film, documentary and drama, working across over sixty productions, including arts and charity films, short films, TV documentaries, mainly as an editor.

After directing several short films with Scottish Screen and BBC Scotland funding, Fitzpatrick studied screenwriting at Screen Academy Scotland developing the script for his first short film as writer and director. Entitled Mum's Birthday, the film tells the tale of Alex, a man who must overcome heartbreak to save his relationship with son Stephen on his wife's birthday.

As with previous work, non-professional actors were used in roles close to their everyday lives alongside professional actors.  Young people from Edinburgh's care homes and housing schemes shared the screen with professionals such as Tam Dean Burn. Shot in December 2009 with financial backing from Creative Scotland, the film premiered at the Filmhouse in Edinburgh the following year. The film won Best Actor and Ensemble cast awards at Hollywood Reel Film Festival and Fitzpatrick was nominated in the 2011 British Academy Scotland New Talent Awards writer category.

In 2014, Fitzpatrick made another short film Colours, about an incarcerated gay teenager trying to survive behind bars, working in Scotland's HM Prison Polmont, with inmates given acting roles.

The film was shown at film festivals including Interfilm Berlin, Uppsala International Film Festival and Glasgow Film Festival. The British Film Institute included it in its top 11 films to see at the 11th London Short Film Festival. It also won Best UK Short award at East End Film Festival, and was nominated in the Best Short Film category at the 2014 British Academy Scotland Awards. 
Fitzpatrick of the nomination that "It is an incredible achievement for everyone involved in the film. I am personally delighted that Colours has been recognised in this way, it is a testament to the hard work put in by the entire team."

He is currently the creative manager of Screen Education Edinburgh. and working on his first feature film 'Make Her Proud'.

Filmography

Awards

References

External links

 Screen Education Edinburgh
 Watch Mum's Birthday & Colours

Living people
Scottish film directors
People educated at Broughton High School, Edinburgh
Year of birth missing (living people)
Film people from Edinburgh